Stephen McNally (born Horace Vincent McNally; July 29, 1911 – June 4, 1994) was an American actor remembered mostly for his appearances in many Westerns and action films. He often played hard-hearted characters, criminals, bullies, and other villains.

Early years
Born in New York City, McNally attended Fordham University School of Law and was an attorney in the late 1930s before he pursued his passion for acting. He was a one time president of the Catholic Actors Guild.

Career
He started his stage career using his real name, Horace McNally, and began appearing uncredited in many World War II-era films. In 1948, he changed his stage name to Stephen McNally (taking the name of his then-2-year-old son) and began appearing credited as both movie villains and heroes. In 1940, as "Horace McNally," he played Dr. Richardson in the Broadway stage production of Johnny Belinda.

He played menacing roles in such films as Johnny Belinda (1948) and the James Stewart Western Winchester '73 (1950). He co-starred in the Burt Lancaster film noir Criss Cross (1949). Other notable 1950s films included No Way Out (1950), Split Second (1953) and Johnny Rocco (1958).

McNally was cast in three episodes of the ABC religion anthology series Crossroads. He portrayed Monsigneur Harold Engle in "Ringside Padre" (1956) and Father Flanagan of the Boys Town orphanage in Nebraska in "Convict 1321, Age 21" (1957). In between, he was cast as United States Army General George S. Patton, in "The Patton Prayer" (also 1957). McNally also appeared in the episode "Specimen: Unknown" from the anthology series The Outer Limits.

McNally also co-starred on the 1958 episode, "The Ben Courtney Story" on Wagon Train as a former Union soldier turned sheriff. In 1959, he portrayed Clay Thompson, a bounty hunter, with Myron Healey as a sheriff, in the CBS Western series, The Texan, starring Rory Calhoun.

In the 1960 episode "The Mormons" on the CBS western, Dick Powell's Zane Grey Theatre McNally played Matt Rowland, who tries to block a wagon train of Mormons from entering his town, as they are suspected of carrying cholera. Things change quickly, when Rowland's son, Tod (Mark Goddard), becomes interested in a young lady on the train, Beth Lawson (Tuesday Weld).

In another 1960 role, McNally was cast in the episode "Moment of Fear" of the CBS/Four Star Television anthology series, The DuPont Show with June Allyson, with episode co-stars Edgar Bergen and Darryl Hickman. Thereafter, he appeared in the NBC anthology series The Barbara Stanwyck Show, and in the Darren McGavin western series Riverboat. In 1961, he portrayed the part of Sky Blackstorm in the episode "Incident of the Blackstorms" on CBS's Rawhide.

In the 1961–62 season, McNally and Robert Harland had their own crime drama on ABC, another Four Star Production called Target: The Corruptors!. The program aired on Friday in a good time slot after the popular 77 Sunset Strip, but it failed to gain renewal for a second season. McNally played a crusading newspaper reporter in the series, with Harland cast as his undercover agent. In 1963 he portrayed a military project manager who unknowingly employs escaped murder convict (but innocent) Richard Kimball In The Fugitive. 

In 1967 he started as “Dal Neely”, a murdering outlaw who tries to take his daughter away with him in the (S12E23) episode “The Lure” on the TV Western Gunsmoke.  In 1971 McNally appeared as Gus Muller in "The Men From Shiloh" (rebranded name for the TV western The Virginian) in the episode titled "The Angus Killer." During the 1970s, McNally guest starred on television programs such as Fantasy Island, Starsky & Hutch, Charlie's Angels, and James Garner's The Rockford Files and Police Story.

Death
McNally died of heart failure June 4, 1994, at age 82, at his home in Beverly Hills, California. He and his wife, Rita, had eight children.

Partial filmography

 Grand Central Murder (1942) – 'Turk'
 The War Against Mrs. Hadley (1942) – Peters
 Eyes in the Night (1942) – Gabriel Hoffman
 For Me and My Gal (1942) – Mr. Waring
 Dr. Gillespie's New Assistant (1942) – Howard Allwinn Young
 Keeper of the Flame (1942) – Freddie Ridges
 Air Raid Wardens (1943) – Dan Madison
 The Man from Down Under (1943) – 'Dusty' Rhodes
 An American Romance (1944) – Teddy Roosevelt Dangos / Narrator
 Thirty Seconds over Tokyo (1944) – 'Doc' White
 Dangerous Partners (1945) – Co-pilot
 Bewitched (1945) – Eric Russell
 The Harvey Girls (1946) – 'Goldust' McClean
 Up Goes Maisie (1946) – Tim Kingby
 Magnificent Doll (1946) – John Todd
 Johnny Belinda (1948) – Locky McCormick
 Rogues' Regiment (1948) – Carl Reicher
 Criss Cross (1949) – Pete Ramirez
 City Across the River (1949) – Stan Albert
 The Lady Gambles (1949) – Horace Corrigan
 Sword in the Desert (1949) – David Vogel
 Woman in Hiding (1950) – Selden Clark IV
 Winchester '73 (1950) – Dutch Henry Brown
 No Way Out (1950) – Dr. Dan Wharton
 Wyoming Mail (1950) – Steve Davis
 Air Cadet (1951) – Major Jack Page
 Apache Drums (1951) – Sam Leeds
 Iron Man (1951) – George Mason
 The Lady Pays Off (1951) – Matt Braddock
 The Raging Tide (1951) – Lt. Kelsey
 Diplomatic Courier (1952) – Col. Mark Cagle
 The Duel at Silver Creek (1952) – Marshal Lightning Tyrone
 Battle Zone (1952) – Sgt. Mitch Turner
 The Black Castle (1952) – Count Karl von Bruno
 Split Second (1953) – Sam Hurley
 The Stand at Apache River (1953) – Lane Dakota
 Devil's Canyon (1953) – Jessie Gorman
 Make Haste to Live (1954) – Steve Blackford
 A Bullet Is Waiting (1954) – Sheriff Munson
 The Man from Bitter Ridge (1955) – Alec Black
 Violent Saturday (1955) – Harper (bank robber)
 Tribute to a Bad Man (1956) – McNulty
 Hell's Crossroads (1957) – Victor 'Vic' Rodell
 Hell's Five Hours (1958) – Mike Brand
 The Fiend Who Walked the West (1958) – Marshal Frank Emmett
 Johnny Rocco (1958) – Tony Rocco
 Hell Bent for Leather (1960) – Deckett
 Requiem for a Gunfighter (1965) – Red Zimmer
 Panic in the City (1968) – James Kincade
 Once You Kiss a Stranger (1970) – Police Lt. Tom Gavin
 Black Gunn (1972) – Laurento
 The Lives of Jenny Dolan (1975, TV Movie) – Lt. Nesbitt
 Mission to Glory: A True Story (1977) – Father Juan Salvatierra (uncredited)
 Hi-Riders (1978) – Mr. Lewis

Radio appearances

References

External links

 
  (as Horace McNally)
 

1911 births
1994 deaths
20th-century American lawyers
20th-century American male actors
American Roman Catholics
American male film actors
American male television actors
Male Western (genre) film actors
Male actors from New York City
Western (genre) television actors